Mitali Mayekar (born: 11 September 1996) is an Indian Marathi television and film actress. At the age of 13, She debut in the acting industry with Irrfan Khan's movie Billu in 2009.

Personal life 
Mitali was in a romantic relationship with Siddharth Chandekar, who is also an actor. They tied the knot on 24 th January 2021.

Career 
Before work as an young, she worked before as a child actor in Irrfan Khan's film Billu. She played the role of daughter of Irfan Khan. She has also done supporting roles in Marathi television shows such as Asambhav, Anubandh, Bhagyalakshmi, Unch Majha Jhoka and Tu Majha Saangaati. She did her film debut with Urfi Marathi movie as a lead. In 2016, she played a role of Sayali Bankar in Freshers serial. Currently, she appeared in Ladachi Mi Lek Ga! serial.

Filmography

Films

Television

Web series

References

External links 

 Mitali Mayekar on IMDb

Indian film actresses
Actresses from Mumbai
21st-century Indian actresses
Actresses in Marathi cinema
Actresses in Marathi television
Indian television actresses
Indian child actresses
Living people
1996 births